Dayu Subdistrict is a subdistrict within  Mentougou District, Beijing, China. It shares border with Chengzi Subdistrict and Longquan Town in the north, Guangning Subdistrict in the east, Yongding and Longquan Towns in the south, and Dongxinfang Subdistrict in the west. As of 2020, it had a census population of 87,097. 

The name Dayu was inherited from a village that used to exist in the region.

History

Administrative Divisions 
In the year 2021, Dayu Subdistrict consisted of 33 communities:

See also 

 List of township-level divisions of Beijing

References 

Mentougou District
Subdistricts of Beijing